What Happens in Hell, Stays in Hell is the eighth studio album by the psychobilly band the Nekromantix, released August 2, 2011 through Hellcat Records. It is the band's first album with guitarist Franc and drummer Lux; Franc replaced touring guitarist Pete Belair in 2007, while Lux replaced former drummer Andy DeMize who was killed in a car crash in January 2009.

Track listing

Personnel
Kim Nekroman - double bass, lead vocals
Franc - guitars, backing vocals
Lux - drums, backing vocals

Technical
Maor Appelbaum - mastering

References

Nekromantix albums
2011 albums